Saint-Jean-Saint-Nicolas (Vivaro-Alpine: Sant Joan Sant Nicolau) is a commune in the Hautes-Alpes department in southeastern France.

Population

See also
Communes of the Hautes-Alpes department

References

Communes of Hautes-Alpes